Sony Channel (formerly known as Sony Entertainment Television) was a general entertainment channel that was part of the DStv bouquet of Sub-Saharan Africa satellite channels owned by MultiChoice.

History
The Sony Channel was the local South African version and subsidiary of the Sony Entertainment Television brand, which is seen in over 100 countries worldwide. It was launched in South Africa on 2 November 2007 and was based in Johannesburg. 
The channel broadcasts a mix of programming including drama, comedy and reality series as well as commercial and independent movies. The channel was also the premiere broadcaster of the reality series The Amazing Race.

On 22 September 2014, the channel abruptly rebranded to Sony Channel with its new logo on air.

The channel, alongside Sister 
channel, Sony MAX, were discontinued on 31 October 2018 on DStv, and on 28 February 2019 on Black.

Former series and shows 
The Bernie Mac Show
Billable Hours
The Boondocks
Chef Roblé & Co.
Crossing Lines
Drop Dead Diva
Early Edition
The Fresh Prince of Bel-Air
Friends
The Guardian
Hangin' with Mr. Cooper
In the House
Just Shoot Me
Kung Faux
Las Vegas
Later with Jools Holland
Law & Order: Criminal Intent
Less Than Kind
Leverage
Malcolm & Eddie
Missing
NewsRadio
The OC
The Outer Limits
Packed to the Rafters
Party of Five
Providence
Rabbit Fall
The Shield
Stargate SG-1
Scrubs
The Steve Harvey Show
Sue Thomas F.B. Eye
The West Wing
Third Watch
Will & Grace

See also 
 Sony Channel (Latin America)
 Sony Channel (Southeast Asia)

References

External links 
 Sony Channel official site

Television stations in South Africa
English-language television stations in South Africa
Television channels and stations established in 2007
Sony Pictures Television
Sony Pictures Entertainment
Television channels and stations disestablished in 2019
Defunct mass media in South Africa